Stuart Barlow (born 16 July 1968) is an English football coach and former professional player.

As a player, he was a midfielder and forward from 1989 until 2009. He notably played in the Premier League for Everton and was part of the squad that won the 1994–95 FA Cup. He also played in the Football League for Rotherham United, Oldham Athletic, Wigan Athletic, Tranmere Rovers, Stockport County and Bury before winding his career in Non-league football with Morecambe, Southport, Fleetwood Town and Bamber Bridge.

Following retirement, Barlow worked away from the sport for a number of years before being appointed assistant manager Northern Premier League side Colwyn Bay in 2011.

Playing career
Barlow came into the game at a late age for a professional footballer as he was only playing at Sunday League level when he was 21 years old. He joined Everton in 1990 and went on to feature in the Premier League. In 1995 the club won the FA Cup, although Barlow was not in the side that defeated Manchester United 1–0 in the final at Wembley Stadium, he did appear in earlier rounds including starting the quarter-final versus Newcastle United. Barlow was injured for the semi-final.

Barlow gained a reputation as a pacy striker who would willingly chase lost causes. However, his inability to find the net regularly (despite his pace often putting him through on goal) led to the affectionate nickname of Stuart 'Barndoor' Barlow amongst the Goodison support.
Another nickname was "Jigsaw", as the joke was that, "He went to pieces in the box".

He joined Oldham Athletic for £350,000 a few months later by ex Everton striker and present Athletic manager Graeme Sharp. At the time he came in the Latics were struggling in the First Division. He spent nearly three seasons at the club and scored 32 goals in 93 games, but was sold to Wigan Athletic in 1998 for £45,000 by Neil Warnock. Whilst at Wigan he played in the final as they won the 1998–99 Football League Trophy.

He joined Tranmere Rovers in July 2000 and is best remembered by the club's supporters for scoring a winning goal in an FA Cup fifth round replay win against Premier League club Southampton in the 2000–01 season. With then second tier Tranmere trailing 3–0 at half time, Paul Rideout scored a hat-trick to level the scores before Barlow scored the winner to put Tranmere through to the last eight. After spells with Stockport County and Bury, he joined Conference National side Morecambe in 2006 and later went on to Southport and Fleetwood Town. Whilst with Fleetwood he was loaned out to Bamber Bridge where he eventually joined permanently.

In 2010, a Merseyside Derby charity game was held between former players of Everton and Liverpool at Goodison Park. Stuart scored the only goal in a 1–0 win for Everton.

Coaching career
In November 2011 Barlow became the Assistant manager of Northern Premier League club Colwyn Bay.

Personal life
Barlow retired in 2009 despite being offered a fresh contract by Bamber Bridge. He stated his decision was so he could support and watch his young son play football for his club Formby Juniors, who Barlow ended up coaching. As well as this he also helped a friend in his scaffolding business and aided his wife open her own bridal shop.

References

External links

Stuart Barlow at TranmereRovers.co.uk

1968 births
Living people
English footballers
Everton F.C. players
Rotherham United F.C. players
Oldham Athletic A.F.C. players
Wigan Athletic F.C. players
Tranmere Rovers F.C. players
Stockport County F.C. players
Bury F.C. players
Morecambe F.C. players
Southport F.C. players
Fleetwood Town F.C. players
Bamber Bridge F.C. players
Premier League players
English Football League players
National League (English football) players
Footballers from Liverpool
Association football forwards